Aaron is an unincorporated community in Pleasant Township, Switzerland County, in the U.S. state of Indiana.

History
A post office was established at Aaron in 1871, and remained in operation until it was discontinued in 1907.

Geography

References

Unincorporated communities in Switzerland County, Indiana
Unincorporated communities in Indiana